Ian Ward (1929-2006), was a male former athlete who competed for England.

Early life and education
Ward was educated at Hutton Grammar School before earning a teaching certificate in physical education at Loughborough College. He then obtained a master's degree's at the University of Leeds, a Graduate Fellowship at University of North Carolina and a PhD from the University of Liverpool. He then played rugby for Preston Grasshoppers R.F.C.

Athletics career
He represented England in the pole vault at the 1958 British Empire and Commonwealth Games in Cardiff, Wales.

Personal life
His father Frank Ward played football for Preston North End F.C.

References

1929 births
2006 deaths
English male pole vaulters
Athletes (track and field) at the 1958 British Empire and Commonwealth Games
Commonwealth Games competitors for England